Silicon tetrafluoride or tetrafluorosilane is a chemical compound with the formula SiF4.  This colorless gas is notable for having a narrow liquid range: its boiling point is only 4 °C above its melting point. It was first prepared in 1771 by Carl Wilhelm Scheele by dissolving silica in hydrofluoric acid., later synthesized by John Davy in 1812.  It is a tetrahedral molecule and is corrosive.

Preparation
 is a by-product of the production of phosphate fertilizers wet process production, resulting from the attack of HF (derived from fluorapatite protonolysis) on silicates, which are present as impurities in the phosphate rocks. The hydrofluoric acid and silicon dioxide (SiO2) react to produce hexafluorosilicic acid:
 6 HF + SiO2  →   H2SiF6 + 2 H2O

  

Alternatively, sodium hexafluorosilicate may also be thermally decomposed at — (optionally in inert nitrogen gas atmosphere)

Uses
This volatile compound finds limited use in microelectronics and organic synthesis.

It's also used in production of fluorosilicic acid (see above).

Staying in the 1980s, as part of the Low-Cost Solar Array Project by Jet Propulsion Laboratory, it was investigated as a potentially cheap feedstock for polycrystalline silicon production in fluidized bed reactors. Few methods using it for the said production process were patented.

The Ethyl Corporation process 
In 80s the Ethyl Corporation came up with a process that uses hexafluorosilicic acid and sodium aluminium hydride (NaAlH4) (or other alkali metal hydride) to produce silane (SiH4).

Occurrence
Volcanic plumes contain significant amounts of silicon tetrafluoride. Production can reach several tonnes per day. Some amounts are also emitted from spontaneous coal fires. The silicon tetrafluoride is partly hydrolysed and forms hexafluorosilicic acid.

Safety 
In 2001 it was listed by New Jersey authorities as a hazardous substance that is corrosive and may severely irritate or even burn skin and eyes. It is fatal if inhaled.

See also 

 SiH4 (silane)

 Hexafluorosilicic acid

References

 

Fluorides
Nonmetal halides
Inorganic silicon compounds